Major General Clarence Leonard Tinker (21 November 1887 – 7 June 1942) was a career United States Army officer, the highest ranking Native-American officer (as a member of the Osage Nation), and the first to reach that rank. During World War II, he had been assigned as Commander of the Seventh Air Force in Hawaii to reorganize the air defenses.

He flew to lead a force during the Battle of Midway in June 1942; his plane went out of control and was lost in the ocean. He was the first U.S. Army general officer to be killed during a battle in World War II, and the second general or flag officer, after Rear Admiral Isaac C. Kidd. Tinker Air Force Base in Oklahoma City, Oklahoma is named in his honor.

Early life
Clarence Tinker was born on November 21, 1887 near Pawhuska, Oklahoma in the Osage Nation, the eldest son of George Edward Tinker and Sarah A. (Schwagerte) Tinker. He was raised as an Osage and learned the language and culture from his parents and extended family. His maternal grandmother was half-Osage; both her parents were mixed-race Osage. They had Osage mothers, and fathers who were French traders from Canada.

Tinker received his elementary education in Catholic schools at Hominy and Pawhuska, Oklahoma, and at the Elgin, Kansas public school. Tinker and his friends learned about and idolized the 19th-century Osage Indian scouts who served with the U.S. cavalry, and Bonnycastle, the Osage chief who, according to Dr. James Crowder in his book, Osage General: Maj. Gen. Clarence L. Tinker.", helped to suppress the "Boxer" rebellion in China.

While growing up, Clarence worked in the print shop of his father's newspaper, the Wah-Sha-She News. It was founded by his father and was one of Pawhuska's first weekly newspapers. Beginning in 1900, Tinker attended the Haskell Institute, the famous Indian school in Lawrence, Kansas, but withdrew before graduating.

In the fall of 1906, Tinker enrolled at Wentworth Military Academy in Lexington, Missouri. He graduated 19th out of 34 in the Class of 1908, and was commissioned a third lieutenant in the Philippine Constabulary, serving until 1912.

Army career
Tinker received his commission as a lieutenant in the U.S. Army infantry in March 1912.  After infantry training, Tinker joined the Twenty-fifth Infantry Regiment at Fort George Wright in Spokane, Washington. In 1913, his unit was transferred to Schofield Barracks in Hawaii. There he met and married Madeline Doyle, a native of Halifax, Nova Scotia. During World War I, Tinker served in the southwestern United States and California, and was promoted to major.

In 1919, Tinker began flying lessons. One of his assignments after the war was with the ROTC at Riverside High School in California. When his father came to visit him at the school, they began a conversation in Osage in public. Using his native language was one way that Tinker expressed his identity as Osage.

In 1922, he transferred to the Army Air Service. On July 1, 1922, he was assigned to flight duty. For a time, Tinker served as the air attache to the US embassy in London. He studied at the Army Command and Staff College in the same class as Dwight D. Eisenhower.

In 1927, he was named Commandant of the Air Service Advanced Flying School at Kelly Field, Texas. Tinker commanded various pursuit and bomber units during the 1930s. He was steadily promoted, and on October 1, 1940, became a brigadier general.

After the Japanese attack on Pearl Harbor, Tinker was named Commander of the Seventh Air Force in Hawaii to reorganize the air defenses of the islands. He believed that the Air Force was going to be critical to the entire war, and that Japan would eventually be defeated through a long-strike effort by air. In January 1942, he was promoted to major general, the first Native American in U.S. Army history to attain that rank.

In June 1942, the Japanese began their assault of Midway Island. In the midst of the Battle of Midway, on June 7, General Tinker decided to lead a force of LB-30s of the 31st Bombardment Squadron against the retreating Japanese naval forces. Near Midway Island, his plane was seen to go out of control and plunge into the sea. General Tinker and ten other crewmen perished. The plane and bodies were never recovered. General Tinker's son was also lost at sea while in a dogfight with German planes in 1944.

Legacy
Clarence L. Tinker was the first American general killed in World War II. (Rear Admiral Issac C. Kidd, USN, was killed at Pearl Harbor on December 7, 1941). He received the Soldier's Medal in 1931 and was posthumously awarded the Distinguished Service Medal. 
On October 14, 1942, the Oklahoma City Air Depot was named Tinker Field in his honor. It is now known as Tinker Air Force Base.
 A bust of the general is outside the Air Force Sustainment Center headquarters at Tinker. Several paintings of him, and a display of his awards and medals are in the Tinker Club. His personal papers and original decorations were donated to the base by his widow, Madeline Tinker McCormick.
A K-8 school is named after him at MacDill Air Force Base.
The Osage honor Tinker and other veterans annually at their 4-day In-lon-shka celebration. The veterans' songs celebrate the pride men took in their military service. A tribute song was written especially for Tinker, and men dance and sing to it. His is the only family song for which all the people stand.

References

Further reading
James L. Crowder, Jr., "Osage Aviator: The Life and Career of Major General Clarence L. Tinker," The Chronicles of Oklahoma 65 (Winter 1987-88). 
James L. Crowder, Jr., Osage General: Major General Clarence L. Tinker ([Midwest City, Okla.]: Oklahoma City Air Logistics Center, Tinker Air Force Base, 1987). 
Raymond W. Settle, The Story of Wentworth, Kansas City: Spencer Printing Co., 1950.
John Woolery, "Major General Clarence L. Tinker," The Chronicles of Oklahoma 27 (Fall 1949).

External links

 "Tinker, Clarence Leonard (1887-1942)," Encyclopedia of Oklahoma History and Culture
 Generals.dk

1887 births
1942 deaths
Native American United States military personnel
Osage people
People of Indian Territory
People from Pawhuska, Oklahoma
Military personnel from Oklahoma
Recipients of the Soldier's Medal
Air Corps Tactical School alumni
Battle of Midway
United States Army Air Forces generals
Wentworth Military Academy and College alumni
Recipients of the Distinguished Service Medal (US Army)
People from Hominy, Oklahoma
United States Army Air Forces personnel killed in World War II
United States Army Air Forces generals of World War II
American people in the American Philippines